TRNA-dihydrouridine20a/20b synthase (NAD(P)+) (Dus4p) is an enzyme with systematic name tRNA-5,6-dihydrouracil20a/20b:NAD(P)+ oxidoreductase. This enzyme catalyses the following chemical reaction

 (1) 5,6-dihydrouracil20a in tRNA + NAD(P)+  uracil20a in tRNA + NAD(P)H + H+
 (2) 5,6-dihydrouracil20b in tRNA + NAD(P)+  uracil20b in tRNA + NAD(P)H + H+

A flavoenzyme. The enzyme specifically modifies uracil20a and uracil20b in tRNA.

References

External links 
 

EC 1.3.1